George Frank Forrest (born ca. 1870, Oregon) was an Alaskan politician and the only mayor of Juneau, Alaska to have served non-consecutively three times:

 1901 to 1902
 1904 to 1905
 1907 to 1908

His son, George F. Forrest, Jr. (born on December 12, 1898), served in World War I.

External links
 George Frank Forrest entry at The Political Graveyard

1870 births
Year of death missing
Mayors of Juneau, Alaska